The Laister LP-15 Nugget is an American single-seat, high-wing glider designed by Jack and Bill Laister for the FAI Standard Class. It first flew in 1971.

Design and development
Designed in the 1970s, the Nugget was intended to compete with the new European fiberglass gliders that were beginning to appear, and as such incorporated mixed construction methods. The fuselage is built with a fiberglass cockpit area, with the fuselage aft of the wing trailing edge made from aluminum. The wing is of Chem-weld bonded aluminum construction, the bonding replacing rivets in an attempt to get a surface as smooth and wave-free as fiberglass. The wing employs a Wortmann FX 67 170/150 airfoil and has flaps. The long span flaps serve both as speed-range drag reducing camber changing devices and full deflection high-lift/high-drag landing flaps. The landing gear is a retractible monowheel.

Even though several sources report that the LP-15 was type certified, no type certificate was ever filed for it and all aircraft are registered as Experimental-Racing, Experimental-Exhibition or Experimental-Amateur-built. The LP in the designation indicates Laister Products and the model number is the wingspan in metres.

Operational history
As of January 2016 there were still 9 LP-15 Nuggets registered in the USA.

Aircraft on display
National Soaring Museum - 1

Specifications (LP-15)

See also

References

External links
Photos of the LP-15 in the National Soaring Museum
Video of an LP-15 Nugget in soaring flight

1970s United States sailplanes
LP-15
Aircraft first flown in 1971